The 2021–22 Florida State Seminoles women's basketball team, variously Florida State or FSU, represented Florida State University during the 2021–22 NCAA Division I women's basketball season.  They were led by twenty-fourth-year head coach Sue Semrau, who returned after taking a season-long break and retired following the season. The Seminoles played their home games at the Donald L. Tucker Center on the university's Tallahassee, Florida campus. They competed as members of the Atlantic Coast Conference.

The Seminoles finished the season 17–14 overall and 10–8 in ACC play to finish in a three-way tie for seventh place.  As the ninth seed in the ACC tournament, they defeated eighth seed Boston College in the Second Round before losing to eventual champions, and first seed NC State in the Quarterfinals.  They received an at-large bid to the NCAA tournament, marking the ninth consecutive year the team has qualified for the tournament.  As an eleven seed, the team played a First Four match against , which they lost, 51–60, to end their season.

On March 21, 2022, Semrau announced her retirement after 24 seasons as FSU. She was succeeded by Seminoles associate head coach Brooke Wyckoff, who served as the interim head coach for the team during the 2020–21 season during Semrau's leave of absence.

Previous season

Brooke Wyckoff served as the interim head coach for the season as Sue Semrau took the season off to care for her mother.

The Seminoles finished the season 10–9 and 9–7 in ACC play to finish in a tie for fourth place.  As the fourth seed in the ACC tournament, they lost to Syracuse in the Quarterfinals.  The Seminoles went on to make the NCAA tournament for the eighth consecutive season.  As the nine seed in the HemisFair Regional, the  Seminoles lost to Oregon State in the First Round.

Off-season

Departures

2021 recruiting class

Source:

Roster

Schedule and results

Source:

|-
!colspan=6 style="background:#; color:white;"| Exhibition

|-
!colspan=6 style="background:#; color:white;"| Regular season

|-
!colspan=6 style="background:#; color:white;"| ACC Women's Tournament

|-
!colspan=6 style="background:#; color:white;"| NCAA Women's Tournament

|-

Rankings

*Coaches did not release a Week 2 poll and AP does not release a final poll.

References

External links
 

Florida State Seminoles women's basketball
Florida State
Florida State Seminoles women's basketball seasons
Florida State women's basketball
Florida State women's basketball
Florida State